The celiac (or coeliac) branches of vagus nerve are small branches which provide parasympathetic innervation to the celiac plexus.

Vagus nerve
Nerves of the torso